Euryspilus is a genus of beetles in the family Buprestidae, containing the following species:

 Euryspilus australis (Blackburn, 1887)
 Euryspilus caudatus (Thery, 1910)
 Euryspilus chalcodes (Gory & Laporte, 1838)
 Euryspilus viridis Carter, 1924

References

Buprestidae genera